The Picower Institute for Learning and Memory is, along with the McGovern Institute for Brain Research and the Department of Brain and Cognitive Sciences, one of the three neuroscience groups at MIT. The institute is focused on studying all aspects of learning and memory; specifically, it has received over US$50 million to study Alzheimer's, schizophrenia and similar diseases.

When it was established in 1994, the institute was primarily funded by the Sherman Fairchild Foundation, the RIKEN Brain Science Institute and the National Institute of Mental Health. It was renamed after a $50 million grant by the Picower Foundation in 2002.

On July 1, 2009, Professor Li-Huei Tsai became the director of the Picower Institute. The institute was directed by founder and Nobel Prize laureate Susumu Tonegawa until he resigned on December 31, 2006, motivated by his belief that “a new generation of leadership is needed.”

Notes

External links
Official website

Massachusetts Institute of Technology
Cognitive science research institutes
Neuroscience research centers in the United States
Research institutes in Massachusetts